Baali may refer to:

 Baali language, a Bantu language of the Democratic Republic of the Congo
 Baali people, a group in the Democratic Republic of the Congo, in a patron-vassal relationship with the Kango people

See also
 Baal (disambiguation)
 Bali (disambiguation)